The Vyšší Brod Pass is a mountain pass separating the Bohemian Forest mountain range and the Granite and Gneiss Plateau.

Geography
The pass is located on the border between the Czech Republic and Austria, between the towns of Vyšší Brod and Bad Leonfelden.

Transport
Since the Roman Empire times a road connecting the Danube with Bohemia went over the pass. The old track was replaced by a motor road in modern times. The road border crossing Studánky / Weigetschlag is located here.

 

Mountain passes of Austria
Mountain passes of the Czech Republic
Bohemian Forest